Vicente Acero y Arebo (c. 1675/1680 – 1739) was a Spanish Baroque architect who contributed significantly to the design and construction of the cathedrals of Granada, Guadix, Cádiz, and Málaga.

He was born in Cabárceno, Cantabria, approximately 1675 or 1680, and learned architecture from Francisco Hurtado Izquierdo (1669–1725). He worked in various capacities on cathedrals in the style of Diego de Siloe, whom he praised greatly in writing.

Besides his work on the cathedrals of Granada, Guadix, Cádiz, and Málaga, he also designed the palace of the Dukes of Medinaceli by the Puerto de Santa María in Cádiz (1724), the shrine of the charterhouse of Santa Maria de El Paular in Rascafría, Community of Madrid, and the collegiate church of San Sebastián in Antequera (1738).

He died in Seville in 1739, where he was participating in the design of the Royal Tobacco Factory.

References

17th-century births
1739 deaths
People from the Bay of Santander
Architects from Cantabria
18th-century Spanish architects